Adam Marcus (born 1970) is an American film director, writer and actor.

Family and education
Marcus was born in Westport, Connecticut and attended Staples High School. Marcus was raised in Reform Judaism. His brother, Kipp Marcus would become an actor and be nominated for a Young Artist Award Adam Marcus started his career at the age of fifteen, when he co-created the Westport Theatreworks Theatrical Company where he directed and produced over fifty shows in seven years. He then attended the Tisch School of the Arts at New York University where he won the coveted Best Picture Award at the Student Academy Awards in 1990 for his film, ...so you like this girl.

Disney, New Line and Paramount
In 1991, Marcus was called out to Los Angeles by filmmaker Sean S. Cunningham (the director of the original Friday the 13th) to work on producing and directing features. That same year, he co-produced Johnny Zombie (retitled My Boyfriend's Back) for Cunningham and Disney Studios.

In 1993, Marcus wrote the story for and directed the ninth film in the Friday the 13th series, Jason Goes to Hell: The Final Friday for New Line. He was 23 at the time and the youngest director ever hired by the studio. The three million dollar feature went on to gross over eighteen million domestically and became one of New Line Video's largest releases ever.

Marcus and his writing partner Debra Sullivan then turned their attention to screenwriting for Paramount (the adaptation of James Patterson's Virgin, later titled Cradle and All) and Fox (the original Black Autumn). In 1995, Marcus created the theater company Damn Skippy Theatreworks in L.A. In the Summer and Fall of 1998 Marcus directed the independently financed feature film comedy, Let It Snow (aka Snow Days). The picture marked the return of Bernadette Peters in a feature film after an eight-year absence from film work. The film screened at the Independent Feature Film Market (IFFM) in New York City where it was singled out as the most successful film at the market by Variety, Time Out IndieWire. Let It Snow had its world premiere at the American Film Institute's Los Angeles International Film Festival (AFI's LAIFF) in competition in the New Visions Category; the film won awards at the festival for Best New Writer and Best Editing. The film then went on to be an official selection of Sundance 2000 in the American Spectrum section where it was given two extra screenings and sold out all seven of its showings. Then came the New York/Avignon film festival and the Deauville festival in France, where the film received critical acclaim. Let It Snow received positive reviews from Variety, The Hollywood Reporter, Ain't It Cool News, The New York Times, and The Gore Score as well as a number of other publications worldwide.

Television and Sony Pictures
Marcus then turned to television, where he sold several series to Bright/Kauffman/Crane Productions, Imagine Television, NBC, Fox and The WB. In 2008, Marcus directed the feature film Conspiracy for Sony Pictures, which he co-wrote with Debra Sullivan. The film was shot in Santa Fe, New Mexico with Val Kilmer, Jennifer Esposito and Gary Cole.

Marcus completed the pilot presentation Fitz and Slade and is currently co-writing, directing and serving as executive producer on the web series Connected.

Partnership with Sullivan
In 2013 Marcus co-wrote the sequel to The Texas Chain Saw Massacre, Texas Chainsaw 3D with partner Sullivan and Stephen Susco, which was the first number-one box office film in North America of the year. He co-wrote with Sullivan the feature film Cabin Fever: Outbreak and is directing and co-writing The Plantation, an adaptation of Val Lewton's RKO classic I Walked with a Zombie.

Adam's script for Momentum (aka Gravity), co-written by Sullivan, began production in South Africa starting January 2014. The film was the directorial debut of Stephen Campanelli and stars Morgan Freeman, James Purefoy and Olga Kurylenko. The film premiered at the Fantasia International Film Festival in 2015.

Sources
 Gorezone Magazine (USA) 1993, Iss. 26, pg. 9–12, +61, by: Marc Shapiro, "Starting Work on a Friday"

References

External links
 

1970 births
Male actors from Connecticut
American male film actors
American male screenwriters
20th-century American Jews
Living people
People from Westport, Connecticut
Tisch School of the Arts alumni
Film directors from Connecticut
Staples High School alumni
21st-century American Jews